Macroperipatus is a genus of Neotropical velvet worms in the Peripatidae family. Velvet worms in this genus can have as few as 24 pairs of legs (in M. guianensis) or as many as 42 leg pairs (in M. torquatus). This genus is viviparous, with mothers supplying nourishment to their embryos through a placenta.

Species
The genus contains the following species:
Macroperipatus clarki Arnett, 1961
Macroperipatus guianensis (Evans, 1903)
Macroperipatus insularis Clark, 1937
 Macroperipatus ohausi Bouvier, 1900
Macroperipatus perrieri (Bouvier, 1899)
Macroperipatus torquatus (von Kennel, 1883)
Macroperipatus valerioi Morera-Brenes and León, 1986

Macroperipatus geayi (Bouvier, 1899) is considered a nomen dubium by Oliveira et al. 2012.

References

Onychophorans of tropical America
Onychophoran genera
Taxonomy articles created by Polbot